Acraea pentapolis, also known as the scarce tree-top acraea or eastern musanga acraea, is a butterfly in the family Nymphalidae. It is found in western and central Africa.

Habitat and food
The habitat consists of forests, and the larvae feed on Myrianthus holstii (Urticaceae).

Description
In 1912, Harry Eltringham wrote:

Description in Seitz

A. pentapolis has the hindwing hyaline or transparent at the costal margin, in cellules 5 to 7 as far as the cell and in lc to 4 at the distal margin; thus only the cell, cellules 1a to 2 nearly to the distal margin and the base of cellule 3 (and 4) are scaled; the marginal streaks are often only distinct in cellules 1c to 3. Larva dark umber-brown above with a white spot at each side on segments 4 to 12; head red-brown. Spines black, the one on segment 2 elongated. Pupa whitish with black markings; abdomen dorsally with short, obtuse elevations.
 pentapolis Ward (56 e). Transverse band of the fore wing dull and little distinct; scaling of the hind wing  very thin, pale yellow to whitish. Sierra Leone to the Congo and Uganda, ab. thelestis Oberth. (56 f). Scaling of the hindwing red-yellow. Among the type-form. 
 epidica Oberth. (56 f). Transverse band of the forewing deep black and sharply defined, often much widened; scaling of the hindwing lemon-yellow; distal margin of both wings often broadly darkened. German East Africa.

Subspecies
Acraea pentapolis pentapolis — Cameroon, Gabon, Angola, Democratic Republic of the Congo, Uganda, western Kenya
Acraea pentapolis epidica Oberthür, 1893 — Tanzania, Malawi, Mozambique, eastern Zimbabwe

Taxonomy
It is a member of the Acraea pentapolis species group.-   but see also Pierre & Bernaud, 2014

References

External links

Die Gross-Schmetterlinge der Erde 13: Die Afrikanischen Tagfalter. Plate XIII 56 e, f as thelestis and epidica
Images representing Acraea pentapolis at Bold
Images representing Acraea pentapolis epidica at Bold
Acraea pentapolis Le Site des Acraea de Dominique Bernaud

Butterflies described in 1871
pentapolis
Butterflies of Africa
Taxa named by Christopher Ward (entomologist)